Year 1396 (MCCCXCVI) was a leap year starting on Saturday (link will display the full calendar) of the Julian calendar.

Events 
 January–December 
 May 19 – Martin I succeeds his brother, John I, as King of Aragon (modern-day northeastern Spain).
 July 20 – Queen Margaret I of Denmark, Norway and Sweden publishes the Treaty of Kalmar, proposing the personal union of the three kingdoms of Denmark, Norway (with Iceland, Greenland, the Faroe Islands, Shetland and Orkney) and Sweden (including Finland and Åland).
 July 23 – Queen Margaret makes her great-nephew and adopted son Eric of Pomerania joint ruler of Sweden. Eric has already been made joint ruler of Norway.
 September – Battle of the North Inch ("Battle of the Thirty"): In a mass trial by combat on the North Inch of Perth, Scotland, the Clan Cameron defeat the Clan Mackintosh.
 September 19 – Duke of Brittany John V marries Joan of France.
 September 25 – Battle of Nicopolis: The Ottomans defeat a joint crusade by Hungary, France, the Holy Roman Empire, England and Wallachia, led by King Sigismund of Hungary. This is the last large-scale crusade of the Middle Ages.
 October – A Transylvanian expedition captures Vlad I Uzurpatorul, thus allowing the restoration of Mircea I of Wallachia to the throne.
 October 31 – The widowed Richard II of England (29), and six-year-old Isabella of Valois (daughter of Charles VI of France), are married in Calais, resulting in a temporary peace between the kingdoms of England and France.
 November 24 – The Transit of Venus, the last not to be part of a pair, is possibly observed by Aztec astronomers.
 November 29 – Ralph Neville, 1st Earl of Westmorland, marries Joan Beaufort in England.

 Date unknown 
 The Ottomans capture the Bulgarian fortress of Vidin and Tsar Ivan Sratsimir, ending the Second Bulgarian Empire. The Bulgarian state is reestablished in 1878 as the Principality of Bulgaria.
 France conquers the Republic of Genoa.
 After a 14-year interregnum, Pedro de San Superano is declared ruler of the Principality of Achaea (modern-day Peloponnese, southern Greece).
 Abu Amir succeeds Abdul Aziz II as ruler of the Marinid dynasty, in modern-day Morocco.
 Timur appoints his son Miran Shah, as Timurid viceroy of present-day Azerbaijan.
 The Kart dynasty is brought to an end in east Persia after its remaining rulers are murdered at a banquet by Miran Shah.
 Philibert de Naillac succeeds Juan Fernández de Heredia, as Grand Master of the Knights Hospitaller.
 Huitzilihuitl succeeds his father, Acamapichtli, as ruler of the Aztecs.
 The Ulu Camii Mosque is built in Bursa by the Ottomans.
 The Ming dynasty court of China sends two envoys, Qian Guxun and Li Sicong, to the Ava Kingdom of Burma and the Tai polity of the Mong Mao, in order to resolve a dispute between these two. The travels of the Chinese ambassadors are recorded in the historical text of the Baiyi Zhuan.
 Timur orders the construction of a garden in a meadow, House of Flowers.
 Peasants in the modern-day provinces of Hunan and Hupeh in the east of China plant 84 million fruit trees.
 The University of Zadar is founded, the first university in Croatia.

Births 
 July 31 – Philip III, Duke of Burgundy (d. 1467)
 October 16 – William de la Pole, 1st Duke of Suffolk, English noble (d. 1450)
 date unknown
 Alfonso V of Aragon (d. 1458)
 Bonne of Artois, countess regent of Nevers (d. 1425)
 Ambroise de Loré, baron of Ivry in Normandy (d. 1446)
 Michelozzo, Italian architect and sculptor (d. 1472)
 Ponhea Yat, ruler of the Khmer Empire (d. 1460?)

Deaths 
 January 11 – Isidore Glabas, Metropolitan bishop of Thessalonica (b. 1341/2)
 May 19 – John I of Aragon (b. 1350)
 July 31 – William Courtenay, Archbishop of Canterbury
 September 15 – Queen Sindeok, politically active Korean queen  (b. 1356)
 November 29 – Robert Ferrers, 3rd Baron Ferrers of Wemme (b. 1373)
 date unknown
 John Beaumont, 4th Baron Beaumont, Constable of Dover Castle (b. 1361)
 Frederick II, Marquess of Saluzzo
 Saint Stephen of Perm (b. 1340)
 She Xiang, Chinese tribute chieftain  (b. 1361)

References